The limiting oxygen concentration (LOC), also known as the minimum oxygen concentration (MOC), is defined as the limiting concentration of oxygen below which combustion is not possible, independent of the concentration of fuel.  It is expressed in units of volume percent of oxygen.  The LOC varies with pressure and temperature.  It is also dependent on the type of inert (non-flammable) gas.

Limiting oxygen concentration for solid materials

The effect of increasing the concentration of inert gas can be understood by viewing the inert as thermal ballast that quenches the flame temperature to a level below which the flame cannot exist.  Carbon dioxide is therefore more effective than nitrogen due to its higher molar heat capacity.

The concept has important practical use in fire safety engineering.  For instance, to safely fill a new container or a pressure vessel with flammable gasses, the atmosphere of normal air (containing 20.9 volume percent of oxygen) in the vessel would first be flushed (purged) with nitrogen or another non-flammable inert gas, thereby reducing the oxygen concentration inside the container.  When the oxygen concentration is below the LOC, flammable gas can then be safely admitted to the vessel, because the possibility of internal explosion has been eliminated.

The limiting oxygen concentration is a necessary parameter when designing hypoxic air fire prevention systems.

See also
 Flammability limit
 Flammability diagram

Sources
Monographs
  Chapter 23

 

  (Presented at 9th International Symposium on Loss Prevention and Safety Promotion in the Process Industries, May 1998, Barcelona (Spain))

References

Combustion
Explosion protection
Fire
Safety